Aleksandr Vyacheslavovich Voynov (born 28 October 1993) is a Russian football midfielder. He plays for FC Avangard Kursk.

Club career
He made his debut in the Russian Second Division for FC Avangard Kursk on 16 July 2012 in a game against FC Metallurg Vyksa. He made his Russian Football National League debut for Avangard on 8 July 2017 in a game against FC Olimpiyets Nizhny Novgorod.

References

External links
 Career summary by sportbox.ru 
 

1993 births
Living people
Russian footballers
Association football midfielders
FC Avangard Kursk players